Mikado yellow is a shade of yellow.  The color is displayed at right.  It is one of the colors of the national flags of Colombia and Kazakhstan.  It was also once used for Lincoln automobiles, and is the name of various dyes and colorings.

See also 
 List of colors

References 

Shades of yellow